Mike Miller (born April 9, 1970) is the quarterbacks coach for the Toronto Argonauts of the Canadian Football League (CFL). He also coached in the National Football League (NFL) from 1999 to 2005 and from 2007 to 2012.

Early life
Miller graduated in 1988 from Plum High School in Plum, Pennsylvania, a suburb of Pittsburgh.  He also earned a bachelor's degree in communications from Clarion University of Pennsylvania and a master's degree in education from Robert Morris University.

Coaching career
Miller's first exposure to the professional sports scene was as a public relations intern. He held internships with the Pittsburgh Penguins, Pittsburgh Steelers and Indianapolis Colts. During this time, he also helped the scouting department and learned the inner workings of the coaching profession. He gained valuable experience in his first coaching opportunity as a Running Backs Coach/Graduate Assistant at Robert Morris University where he coached under veteran NFL coaches Joe Walton and Dan Radakovich.

In 1999, Bill Cowher offered Miller his first professional coaching position as an offensive quality control coach with the Pittsburgh Steelers  At this position, Miller worked closely with offensive coordinator Mike Mularkey. When Mularkey was hired as head coach for the Buffalo Bills, Miller was offered a position on his staff as Tight Ends/Quality Control Coach in 2004-2005. Following Mularkey’s dismissal, Miller landed a coaching job with the Berlin Thunder of NFL Europa in 2006. 

In 2007, Ken Whisenhunt was named as head coach of the Arizona Cardinals and offered Miller a position on his staff. Like Mularkey, Whisenhunt first worked with Miller on the Steelers coaching staff. Miller spent the 2007 and 2008 seasons as the wide receivers coach. In 2008, his top two receivers Larry Fitzgerald and Anquan Boldin were named to the Pro Bowl. Also in 2008, Fitzgerald, Boldin and Steve Breaston each gained over 1000 receiving yards, a feat only accomplished five times in NFL history. Miller was promoted to Arizona’s Pass Game Coordinator (2009-2010) and Offensive Coordinator (2011-2012). Miller helped the team reach Super Bowl XLIII in 2009. 

Miller joined the Montreal Alouettes of the Canadian Football League in 2013 as the Assistant Head Coach/Offensive Coordinator/Quarterbacks Coach under the patronage of new head coach Dan Hawkins. The Alouettes were the first offense in CFL history to have 4 starting Quarterbacks each record 2 wins in a season. 

In 2014, Miller became the Offensive Coordinator/Quarterbacks/Receivers Coach for Edinboro University. Edinboro Offense led the country with 80% completion percentage and set single season reception record.  

Following a 2-year stint as Offensive Coordinator/Quarterbacks Coach at Robert Morris University (2016-2017), Miller served as the Westminster College Defensive Coordinator/Defensive Line Coach in 2018. In 2019, Miller moved to a part-time role as Westminster’s Offensive Consultant/Assistant Offensive Line Coach having accepted the Receivers Coaching position with the New York Guardians of the XFL(2020 Season).

On January 19, 2022, it was announced that Miller had joined the Toronto Argonauts as the team's Quarterbacks Coach, overseeing veteran starter McLeod Bethel-Thompson and backup quarterbacks Chad Kelly and Ben Holmes. Under Miller, Bethel-Thompson threw for a CFL-high 4,731 passing yards during the regular CFL season and helped lead the Argos to an upset victory over the Winnipeg Blue Bombers in the 109th Grey Cup. Backup Kelly was also critical in helping lead the Argos to the Championship win by stepping in for the injured Bethel-Thompson in the 4th quarter to lead the Argo’s on their game winning scoring drive.

References

External links
 Toronto Argonauts bio
 Arizona Cardinals bio

1970 births
Living people
Arizona Cardinals coaches
Berlin Thunder coaches
Buffalo Bills coaches
Montreal Alouettes coaches
New York Guardians coaches
Pittsburgh Steelers coaches
Robert Morris Colonials football coaches
National Football League offensive coordinators
Clarion University of Pennsylvania alumni
Robert Morris University alumni
Sportspeople from Pittsburgh
Toronto Argonauts coaches